Philip Frank Hensiek (October 13, 1901 – February 21, 1972), nicknamed "Sid", was a pitcher in Major League Baseball. He played for the Washington Senators in 1935.

References

External links

1901 births
1972 deaths
Albany Senators players
American expatriate baseball players in Canada
Baseball players from St. Louis
Burials at Calvary Cemetery (St. Louis)
Chattanooga Lookouts players
Dallas Steers players
Decatur Commodores players
Dyersburg Deers players
Jackson Senators players
Major League Baseball pitchers
Minneapolis Millers (baseball) players
Monroe Drillers players
Montreal Royals players
Washington Senators (1901–1960) players